Brian Francis Slattery is an American writer and an editor at The New Haven Review. He has published three novels, Spaceman Blues: A Love Song (Tor, 2007), Liberation: Being the Adventures of the Slick Six After the Collapse of the United States of America (Tor, 2008), and Lost Everything (Tor, 2012).

Spaceman Blues was nominated for best novel by both the Lambda Literary Awards and the Gaylactic Spectrum Awards . The editors of Amazon.com named Liberation the best science fiction/fantasy book of 2008, saying it "combined the serious and the satirical in creating an unforgettable image of a future America beset by the collapse of the dollar and the specter of a new form of slavery."

Slattery plays the fiddle and the banjo, and he lives outside New Haven, Connecticut with his family.

Bibliography

Novels 
 Spaceman Blues: A Love Song (2007)
 Liberation: Being the Adventures of the Slick Six After the Collapse of the United States of America (2008)
 Lost Everything (2012)
 The Family Hightower (2014)

Serial fiction
 Bookburners (created by Max Gladstone)
 Bookburners Season One (with Gladstone, Margaret Dunlap, and Mur Lafferty)
 Episode 2: "Anywhere But Here" (2015)
 Episode 6: "Big Sky" (2015)
 Episode 12: "Puppets" (2015)
 Episode 14: "An Excellent Day for an Exorcism" (2015)

Short fiction
 "The Death and Life of Elodia Harwinton", The Revelator, (2014)
 "The Syndrome", Subterranean, (2013)
 "The Ashland Waltz", The Revelator, (2012)
 "The Spleen Brothers", The Revelator, (2011)
 "The Big Deal", The Dirty Pond, (2009)
 "Interviews After the Revolution", Interfictions 2, (2009)
 "The World Is a Voice in My Neighbor's Throat", Brain Harvest, (2009)
 "A Push-Reel Mower's Rumination on Mowing the Lawn in the Gas-Powered Age", McSweeney's Internet Tendency, (2006)
 "The Things that Get You", Glimmer Train, (2002)

Awards and honors
 2012 Philip K. Dick Award, Lost Everything

References

External links
 Brian Francis Slattery Website
 Review of Spaceman Blues in the Village Voice
 Review of Liberation in the Las Vegas Weekly
 Review of Lost Everything in Upcoming4.me
 Interview of Slattery by Leonard Lopate on WNYC radio
 New Haven Review Website

Living people
American male novelists
Year of birth missing (living people)